Termitomyces robustus is a mushroom in the genus Termitomyces. Attempts at cultivation by humans have failed in past trials.

As with all members of the genus Termitomyces, these fungi are cultivated exclusively by Termite species.

References

Lyophyllaceae
Fungi described in 1927